Adır Island or Lim Island ( Lim kghzi), is the largest island in Lake Van, located in the North East part of the lake.  During the Armenian genocide upwards of 12,000 Armenian women and children, crossed to the isle over a period of three days while a few dozen men covered their retreat from Hamidiye regiments.  The Situation became soon critical because of a lack of food.

The Armenian Monastery on the island was called St. George or Sourp Kevork. It was built in 1305 and expanded in 1621 and 1766. The Monastery is currently in ruins. The island also contains a cemetery of Armenian khachkars.

Gallery

References

External links
Lim island and Armenian monastery "Anapat" on Panoramio: photo1, photo2, photo3, photo4, photo5, photo6

Islands of Lake Van
Islands of Van Province
Islands of Turkey